The Revolution of 1719 was a bloodless military coup in the Province of South Carolina which resulted in the overthrow of the Lords Proprietors and the installation of Colonel James Moore, Jr. as the colony's de facto ruler. The Revolution of 1719 led to the permanent end of proprietary rule in South Carolina and its recreation as a crown colony.

Background
Between 1663 and 1665, Charles II of England granted the Province of Carolina to eight non-resident proprietary lords. European settlement of the area, however, was limited to Charleston and what later was called Albemarle County, the two places being geographically non-contiguous. By 1710 the two regions had effectively ceased operating as a single political entity, resulting in the creation of the Province of North Carolina – composed of the area centered around Albemarle County – and the Province of South Carolina.

By 1719, South Carolinian legislative authority was vested in a bicameral body composed of the popularly elected Commons House of Assembly sitting as a lower chamber, and the Grand Council of the Lords Proprietors, which functioned both as an upper chamber and as a collegiate executive, though its day-to-day powers were exercised by a governor it appointed. Governance of South Carolina by the proprietary lords has been characterized as ineffective and erratic. Their failure to adequately prepare for defense of the colony during the Yamasee War created further strain between the people and the London-based proprietors.

Revolution
In November 1719 word arrived in Charleston of an approaching Spanish fleet; the colonial militia was ordered mobilized to repel an anticipated invasion. 

On November 17, prior to the militia muster, several prominent residents of South Carolina – among them militia officer Colonel James Moore, Jr. and Arthur Skeene, the Speaker of the Commons House of Assembly – met and formed a committee for the purpose of the overthrow of the government.  The committee made contact with senior officers of the militia and secured their support. Upon learning of the unfolding conspiracy, Governor Robert Johnson ordered the Commons House of Assembly dissolved. On December 21 the coup occurred; following the assembly's formal dissolution, its members reconvened in a tavern and declared themselves a "convention of the people" with penultimate political authority in South Carolina. Moore was elected to the office of provisional governor and the legislative role of the Grand Council replaced with a new chamber appointed by the revolutionary committee. Johnson, deposed as governor, was unable to resist as the whole of the militia ultimately sided with the plotters. As a result, the coup passed without fighting or bloodshed. 

Among the revolutionary government's first orders of business was to petition the Crown to withdraw the proprietary charter of South Carolina and recreate it as a royal colony instead. By the following year, the revolutionary government's wishes were granted and direct, royal rule established. While the revolutionary government requested that Moore continue as royal governor, Francis Nicholson was instead installed by royal appointment.

Aftermath
After surrendering the government to Nicholson, Moore served as Speaker of the Commons House of Assembly until his death in 1724.

Royal rule effectively ended in South Carolina on March 26, 1776, when the colony unilaterally declared itself a republic and elected John Rutledge as the first President of South Carolina. The following July it ratified the United States Declaration of Independence.

The governor of the neighboring North Carolina would continue to be appointed by the Lords Proprietor until 1729.

See also
 History of South Carolina
 Proprietary colony
 South Carolina National Guard
 Sword of State of South Carolina

References

1719 in North America
Colonial South Carolina
Conflicts in 1719
Coups d'état and coup attempts in the United States